Robert Clive (1725–1774), also known as Clive of India, was the first British Governor of the Bengal Presidency.

Robert Clive may also refer to:

People
Robert Clive (1769–1833), MP for Ludlow, son of Clive of India
Robert Clive (1789–1854) (Robert Henry Clive), British politician, grandson of Clive of India
Robert Clive (diplomat) (Robert Henry Clive, 1877–1948), British diplomat

Other uses

See also
 Robert Windsor-Clive (disambiguation)